Elethyia taishanensis is a moth in the family Crambidae. It was described by Aristide Caradja and Edward Meyrick in 1937. It is found in the Chinese provinces of Shandong and Shaanxi.

References

Ancylolomiini
Moths described in 1937